St Mary's Church is a redundant Anglican church in the village of Stainburn, North Yorkshire, England.  It is recorded in the National Heritage List for England as a designated Grade I listed building, and is under the care of the Churches Conservation Trust.

History

The church was built in the 12th century as a chapel of ease in the parish of Kirkby Overblow.  Alterations were made to the church in the 17th century. In 1894 it was restored and additions were made by C. Hodgson Fowler.  This included re-roofing the church, refitting the chancel, the addition of the vestry, and relaying of the grave slabs.  St Mary's was declared redundant on 1 December 1975, and was vested in the Trust on 30 March 1977.

Architecture

Exterior
St Mary's is constructed in gritstone rubble and has a graduated stone slate roof.  Its plan consists of a three-bay nave with a south porch, and a single-bay chancel with a north vestry. A two-arched bellcote stands on the junction between the nave and the chancel.  Much of the church is Norman in style.  The porch has a round-arched doorway, and the door to the church has a plain tympanum.  To the left of the door is a square-headed window and to the right are two lancet windows on each side of a window with a pointed arch.  At the west end is a lancet window, and in the north wall is a two-light mullioned window.  The chancel is lower and narrower than the nave.  The east window has three lights and is in Perpendicular style.  On the south wall of the chancel is a blocked doorway and a three-light mullioned window.

Interior
The chancel arch is Norman in style, having a round arch and two orders.  The font is Norman and consists of a circular carved bowl on a circular stem.  The pews date from the 16th and 17th centuries.

See also

Grade I listed buildings in North Yorkshire
List of churches preserved by the Churches Conservation Trust in Northern England

References

12th-century church buildings in England
17th-century Church of England church buildings
Grade I listed churches in North Yorkshire
Churches completed in 1894
English churches with Norman architecture
English Gothic architecture in North Yorkshire
Churches preserved by the Churches Conservation Trust
Church of England church buildings in North Yorkshire